William Orville "Potch" Pottenger (November 7, 1921 – April 9, 1978) was an American football player and coach.

Career 
Pottenger served as the head football coach at his alma mater, Southwest Missouri State University now known as Missouri State University—in Springfield, Missouri, from 1961 to 1964, compiling a record of 24–12–1. Pottenger was a three-time letter-winner at Southwest Missouri State, from 1939 to 1941. He was the head football coach at Lamar High School in Lamar, Missouri from 1952 to 1955 and Parkview High School in Springfield from 1956 to 1960.

Before that, beginning June 1949, Pottenger was an assistant football coach at Southwestern University, Georgetown, Texas, under head coach Spot Collins (1922–1996). Pottenger and Collins were also members of the Marine Corps Reserve unit, Company A (a rifle company), 15th Infantry Battalion, of Austin. Company A was mobilized July 27, 1950, after the outbreak of the Korean War. The company was composed of about 160 men, half of whom had served in World War II. Company A also included Lieutenant John Hargis (1920–1986), a basketball star of the University of Texas. Pottenger served in the Marines during World War II and the Korean War.

In 1954, Pottenger earned a Master of Education degree from the University of Texas at Austin.

In 1968, while serving as Director of Athletics for the Springfield Public School system, Col. Pottenger relieved Col. Lang Rogers (né Harrison Lang Rogers; 1919–2002) of Joplin as Commanding Officer of the Marine Corps Volunteer Training Unit 9-15. Col. Rogers was also editor and publisher of The Joplin Globe and News Herald.

Head coaching record

College

Bibliography

Notes

References 

 

 
 
  –

External links
 

1921 births
1978 deaths
American football centers
Missouri State Bears football coaches
Missouri State Bears football players
High school football coaches in Missouri
Missouri State University alumni
University of Texas at Austin alumni
United States Marine Corps personnel of World War II
United States Marine Corps personnel of the Korean War